Calling the Swan (2000) is a young-adult novel by Jean Thesman.

Plot 
Skylar Deacon is struggling with many things in her life: a toddler brother, a summer school class in another part of town, riding the bus to get there, new friendships at the school, and conflicting advice from her sister. Most of all, she's struggling with a secret tragedy that has been damaging her family for three years. Her mother is even worse, amplifying Skylar's fears and guilt. But Skylar finds help in her strong grandmother, kind priest-counselor, and later her new friends Tasha, Naomi, Margaret, D.J., and Shawn. And with that help, she begins to find the courage to heal her life.

Literary references 
Mrs. Vargas, Skylar's summer school English teacher, reads stories and poems for class discussion and essays. The following are mentioned and become part of the plot:
Shirley Jackson, "The Very Strange House Next Door" (short story)
Ray Bradbury, "There Will Come Soft Rains" (short story)
D.H. Lawrence, "Snake" (poem)
Frank O'Connor, "First Confession" (short story)

2000 American novels
American young adult novels